"The U.S. Remixes" is a special edition 12" quadrapack by Belgian/Dutch Eurodance band 2 Unlimited.

Release
Released only in the U.S.A as a limited edition 12" quadrapack, this release contains exclusive remixes of "Throw The Groove Down" and "No Limit" taken from 2 Unlimited's second studio album "No Limits".

Top American and European, DJs and producers, including David Morales, DJ Roach, Chris Cox, Ron Hester, Bill Hallquist, Markus Schulz, Hippie Torales and Mixmaster all had a hand in producing the remixes.

Although the remixes are exclusive to this release, some of the remixes can be found in other territories on DJ exclusive compilations such as Hot Tracks and Ultimix.

Track listing

Remix Credits

Alternate Remix Information 
 Ultimix
 Roach's Ultimix (5:46)
An alternate version is found on Ultimix Volume 51.

The track has been re-edited differently from the 12" release version.
This version is found on both the 12" and CD release of Ultimix 51.

 Hot Tracks
 Euro Extended Mix (5:47)
The same remix, only at the beginning there's a female voice as an intro before the real remix begins. Is also referred as the "Hot Tracks Digital Remix".

This remix is found on both the 12" and CD compilation releases of Hot Tracks 13-2.

References

1994 singles
2 Unlimited songs